Al-Garaf is a sub-district located in Khamir District, 'Amran Governorate, Yemen. Al-Garaf had a population of 4,321 according to the 2004 census.

References 

Sub-districts in Khamir District